Mark Herring (born 5 December 1984) is an international swimmer and New Zealand Olympiad 1041 who competed for New Zealand in the 2008 Summer Olympics in the 4 × 100 metre freestyle relay, describing it as "a highlight of his swimming career." He competed in the 50 metre and the 100 metre freestyle events at the 2007 World Aquatics Championships.  He has competed in the Oceania Swimming Championships in the 50 metere freestyle, 100 metre freestyle, and 4x100 metere freestyle and has won a total of 7 medals, 3 gold, 2 silver, and 2 bronze. His father, Colin Herring, had competed for New Zealand in two swimming events at the 1972 Summer Olympics.

References

New Zealand male freestyle swimmers
Olympic swimmers of New Zealand
Swimmers at the 2008 Summer Olympics
Living people
1984 births
21st-century New Zealand people